Styphelia planifolia is a small  shrub (growing from 0.35 to 2 m high) in the family Ericaceae native to Western Australia.<ref name=WA>{{FloraBase|id=6430|name=Leucopogon planifolius}}</ref> It was first described as Leucopogon planifolius in 1845 by Otto Wilhelm Sonder, but moved to the genus, Styphelia, by Hermann Sleumer in 1963. Until 2020, the name Leucopogon planifolius was the name accepted by the Council of Heads of Australasian Herbaria, but the Herbarium of Western Australia now accepts the name Styphelia planifolia'' based on the phylogenetic studies of  Crayn and others.

Distribution 
It is found in the IBRA regions of : Avon Wheatbelt, Esperance Plains, Geraldton Sandplains, Jarrah Forest, Mallee, and the Swan Coastal Plain, growing on yellow or grey sand.

References 

planifolia

Plants described in 1845
Ericales of Australia
Flora of Western Australia